Samoth (born Tomas Thormodsæter Haugen, 9 June 1974) is a Norwegian guitarist and multi-instrumentalist in the country's black metal scene. He is well known for his distinct guitar work and drumming in the band Emperor, as well as his formation of the death metal band Zyklon. In very early Emperor releases, he was called Samot (his name "Tomas" backward), and with the formation of Zyklon he became known as Zamoth. Samoth was the owner of the record label Nocturnal Art Productions and had a close relationship with Candlelight Records.

Biography 
Samoth was born on 9 June 1974 in Hammerfest. He is the son of Spoonful of Blues bass player Jens Haugen, who encouraged his son to play bass guitar. He grew up in Akkerhaugen, Norway. When Samoth was a young man, he met a fellow musician, who would later become known as Ihsahn, at a rock clinic in Bergen. The two soon became friends and started playing music together. They formed a band and moved through various names – they were called Dark Device, Xerasia, and finally Embryonic. The group eventually settled on the name Thou Shalt Suffer in 1991. They were playing an early form of black metal with keyboards strongly influenced by death metal, particularly vocally.

Samoth and Ihsahn's friendship proved to be strong, and the two eventually took their musicianship to a new level. Partially due to the influence of Euronymous of the band Mayhem, Samoth left Thou Shalt Suffer and with Ihsahn, began writing music for a new band called Emperor (in which he played drums). Ihsahn was the only member of Thou Shalt Suffer to remain, and soon bass player Mortiis and drummer Faust were recruited for Emperor; Samoth moved back to his more familiar position of guitar. At this point, the group was playing fully developed black metal. Emperor was quick to release several demos in 1992 and 1993, which gained them recognition and popularity in the underground. Mortiis did not stay in the band, and decided to form his own, more electronic-based solo band. He was succeeded by Tchort.

In 1994, Samoth was sentenced to 16 months in prison for burning Skjold Church in Vindafjord, together with Varg Vikernes. The arson was committed during a pause in the recording of the Burzum EP Aske (Ashes), where Samoth performed as a session bass player. As Tchort and Faust were also imprisoned at this time, Ihsahn was the only remaining band member outside prison, and Emperor did not release another album for three years. Tchort and Faust did not return to the band.

After years of playing in Emperor and being featured on various black metal side projects, Samoth, in conjunction with Ihsahn, decided to dissolve Emperor in 2001 due to their differing musical tastes. Although black metal was both Samoth and Ihsahn's biggest influence and favorite genre of music, Samoth was leaning toward a futuristic death metal sound, while Ihsahn was more influenced by progressive metal and symphonic metal. After Emperor's final release, Prometheus: The Discipline of Fire & Demise, composed entirely by Ihsahn, Emperor was no more. Samoth went on to play guitar with fellow drummer Trym in the death metal band Zyklon.

Emperor regrouped in 2006 with the core trio of Ihsahn, Samoth and Trym augmented by a bassist and a keyboardist, and played a few one-night-off gigs in Europe and US in 2006 and 2007.

Recently Samoth was involved in Norwegian-American supergroup Scum, which also featured Bård Faust, Cosmocrator of Mindgrinder, Chasey Chaos of Amen and Happy Tom from Turbonegro.

Samoth did voice work for 2007's Adult Swim cartoon Metalocalypse episode "Dethfashion".

In 2008, Samoth formed The Wretched End with Cosmo and went on to release 3 albums: Ominous (2010), Inroads (2012) and In These Woods, From These Mountains (2016).

Personal life 
Haugen was married to German musician Andrea Haugen (née Meyer), with whom he fathered a daughter. The couple later divorced. On 13 October 2021, Andrea was killed alongside four other people in the Kongsberg attack.

After his divorce from Andrea, he married his second wife Erin, with whom he also has a daughter.

Endorsements and equipment 

Endorsements
ESP Guitars & Basses
Marshall Amplifiers
Vader Cabinets
Dunlop Picks
Ernie Ball Strings

Other equipment
Gibson Guitars
Jackson Guitars
B.C. Rich Guitars
Fender Basses
ENGL Amplifiers
Peavey Amplifiers
Pearl Drums & Hardware
Sabian Cymbals
Ahead drumsticks

Drum kit
Samoth has stated in an interview with Metal Hammer that the following kit was used by himself to record drum tracks for the demo "Wrath of the Tyrant".

Pearl Export Drums (jet black w/ black hardware)
 Bass Drum
 Snare Drum
 Mounted Tom
 Mounted Tom
 Mounted Tom
 Floor Tom
Pearl Eliminator Double Pedal
Sabian and Wuhan Cymbals
 Sabian Solar Ride
 AA Sizzle Hats
 Wuhan China
 B8 Rock Crash
 AA splash
 Wuhan china
 B8 Pro Heavy Crash
 AAX Metal Ride
 Wuhan China

Discography 

 Xerasia – Rehearsals '90 [Demo] – (1990) (guitar)
 Embryonic – The Land of the Lost Souls [Demo] – (1990) (guitar, bass)
Thou Shalt Suffer – Into the Woods of Belial [Demo] – (1991) (guitar)
Thou Shalt Suffer – Open the Mysteries of Your Creations [EP] – (1991) (guitar)
Emperor – Wrath of the Tyrant [Demo] – (1992) (drums)
Ildjarn – Seven Harmonies of Unknown Truths [Demo] – (1992) (session vocals)
Emperor – Emperor / Hordanes Land [Split w Enslaved] – (1993) (guitar)
Burzum – Aske [EP] – (1993) (session bass)
Emperor – As the Shadows Rise [EP] – (1994) (guitar)
Emperor – In The Nightside Eclipse – (1994) (guitar)
Gorgoroth – Pentagram – (1994) (bass)
Satyricon – The Shadowthrone – (1994) (bass, guitar)
Arcturus – Constellation [EP] – (1994) (guitar)
Zyklon-B – Blood Must be Shed [EP] – (1994) (guitar)
Emperor – Reverence [EP] – (1997) (guitar)
Emperor – Anthems to the Welkin at Dusk – (1997) (guitar)
Hagalaz' Runedance – The Winds That Spoke of Midgard's Fate – (1998) (war drums, violas and contrabass)
Emperor – Thorns Vs. Emperor [Split] – (1999) (guitar, bass)
Emperor – IX Equilibrium – (1999) (guitar)
Zyklon – World ov Worms – (2001) (guitar, bass)
Emperor – Prometheus: The Discipline of Fire & Demise – (2001) (guitar)
Zyklon – Aeon – (2003) (guitar)
Notodden All Stars – Valfar, ein Windir – (2004) (guitar on cover of "Destroy")
Scum – Gospels for the Sick- (2005) (guitar)
Zyklon – Disintegrate – (2006) (guitar)
The Wretched End – Ominous – (2010) (guitar)
The Wretched End – Inroads – (2012) (guitar)
The Wretched End – In These Woods, from These Mountains – (2016) (guitar)

References

External links 
Nocturnal Art Productions – Samoth's record label
Emperor Interview – Samoth's interview for The Lodge
Zyklon Interview – Samoth's interview for The Lodge

1974 births
Living people
Norwegian male bass guitarists
Norwegian heavy metal guitarists
Norwegian black metal musicians
Norwegian heavy metal drummers
Male drummers
Norwegian multi-instrumentalists
Norwegian rock guitarists
Musicians from Hammerfest
Satyricon (band) members
Gorgoroth members
Zyklon members
Arcturus (band) members
Emperor (band) members
20th-century Norwegian criminals
21st-century Norwegian drummers
21st-century Norwegian bass guitarists
Norwegian male criminals
Norwegian arsonists